RoboDK is an offline programming and simulation software for industrial robots. The simulation software can be used for many manufacturing projects including milling, welding, pick and place, packaging and labelling, palletizing, painting, robot calibration and more.

Main Features

Robot Brand Independence 

RoboDK has a library of over 500 robots from more than 50 different manufacturers including ABB, Fanuc, Kuka, Motoman, Hwashi Robots and Universal Robots.

User Interface 

The user interface enables easy simulation and doesn't require any previous programming knowledge.

File Format 
Different types of files can be imported including step and iges files. RoboDK post processors allow for programs to be exported to an actual robot including, ABB Rapid (mod/prg), Fanuc LS (LS/TP), Kuka KRC/IIWA (SRC/java), Motoman Inform (JBI), Universal Robots (urscript), Hwashi (C＋＋), Kawasaki (Python and C＋＋) and more.

References

External links
 

Simulation software
Robotics simulation software
Simulation programming languages
Industrial robotics